John Eli "Jeb" Brovsky (born December 3, 1988) is an American former soccer player.

Career

College and amateur
Brovsky played youth soccer for Colorado Rush with whom he won many state and national titles. He went to Green Mountain High School where he played both soccer and football as well as basketball. Brovsky then played for the Notre Dame Fighting Irish for four years and was one of the top players in the Big East Conference.

Professional
Brovsky was drafted first in the second round (19th overall) in the 2011 MLS SuperDraft by Vancouver Whitecaps FC. He signed with Vancouver on March 15, 2011, and made his professional debut on April 10, 2011, in a game against Houston Dynamo.

Brovsky was left exposed by Vancouver in the 2011 MLS Expansion Draft and was selected by expansion side Montreal Impact.

On June 12, 2014 New York City FC, who did not begin play until the 2015 MLS season, traded a second-round 2016 MLS SuperDraft pick to Montreal for Brovsky, making him their second signing. Four weeks later, the New York club sent him on loan to Strømsgodset in Norway, an affiliate of NYCFC's sister club Manchester City, in order to keep him match fit for the start of the 2015 Major League Soccer season.  On July 26, he got his Tippeligaen debut, when he came on as a substitute in the 76th minute in the match against Sandnes Ulf.

After his release from New York City FC, Brovsky was placed in the 2015 MLS Re-Entry Draft. Brovsky later signed for Minnesota United FC in the North American Soccer League.

Career statistics

Personal life
Brovsky married his childhood sweetheart, Caitlin Brovsky, on December 8, 2012. Brovsky founded his nonprofit Peace Pandemic in 2010 while at the University of Notre Dame. Peace Pandemic aims to end violence against women and empower boys and girls worldwide through soccer.
Brovsky travels with his wife and they have held camps in India and Guatemala.

Brovsky has been an official ambassador of the Homeless World Cup movement since 2014.

Honors

Montreal Impact
Canadian Championship: 2013, 2014

References

External links
 

1988 births
Living people
American expatriate soccer players
American expatriate sportspeople in Norway
American soccer players
Association football defenders
Colorado Rapids U-23 players
Eliteserien players
Expatriate soccer players in Canada
Expatriate footballers in Norway
Major League Soccer players
Minnesota United FC (2010–2016) players
CF Montréal players
New York City FC players
North American Soccer League players
Notre Dame Fighting Irish men's soccer players
People from Lakewood, Colorado
Strømsgodset Toppfotball players
Soccer players from Colorado
USL League Two players
Vancouver Whitecaps FC draft picks
Vancouver Whitecaps FC players
Sportspeople from the Denver metropolitan area
American expatriate sportspeople in Canada